Tanvir Ahmed (born 20 December 1978) is a former Pakistani Test cricketer born in Kuwait. Ahmed is mainly a fast-bowler. He played for Pakistan in a first-class match against Worcestershire in the tour of England in 2010 He was later chosen to play in the second test in Pakistan's 2010 home series against South Africa in the UAE in which he took six wickets (6/120) during the first innings.

Early life
He was born in Kuwait but his family returned to Karachi because of the Gulf War, and he first began to play cricket in the city's streets at the age of 14.

ODI
Tanvir made his ODI debut on 2 May 2011 in the 4th One Day International against the West Indies, along with Usman Salahuddin, taking 1 wicket for 45 runs off 6 overs.

See also
 List of Pakistan Test cricketers who have taken five wickets on debut
 List of Test cricketers born in non-Test playing nations

References

External links

1978 births
Living people
Pakistani cricketers
Sportspeople from Kuwait City
Allied Bank Limited cricketers
Baluchistan cricketers
Karachi cricketers
Public Works Department cricketers
Pakistan One Day International cricketers
Pakistan Twenty20 International cricketers
Pakistan Test cricketers
Cricketers who have taken five wickets on Test debut
Karachi Urban cricketers
Karachi Blues cricketers
Karachi Whites cricketers
Zarai Taraqiati Bank Limited cricketers
Sindh cricketers
Port Qasim Authority cricketers
Karachi Zebras cricketers
Karachi Dolphins cricketers
Pakistani expatriates in Kuwait